The South Carolina Wing of the Civil Air Patrol (CAP) is the highest echelon of Civil Air Patrol in the state of South Carolina and is part of the Mid-Atlantic Region of CAP. South Carolina Wing headquarters are located in West Columbia, South Carolina. The South Carolina Wing consists of over 750 cadet and adult members at over 17 locations across the state of South Carolina.

Mission
The Civil Air Patrol has three primary missions: providing emergency services; offering cadet programs for youth; and providing aerospace education for CAP members and the general public.

Emergency services
The Civil Air Patrol performs a variety of emergency services and operational missions. These missions include: search and rescue missions directed by the Air Force Rescue Coordination Center at Tyndall Air Force Base; disaster relief, including air and ground transportation and an extensive communications network; and humanitarian services, including transporting time-sensitive medical materials including blood and human tissue, generally on behalf of the Red Cross when conventional methods of transport are unavailable. The Civil Air Patrol also provides Air Force support through the conducting of light transport, communications support, and low-altitude route surveys. In addition, CAP offers support to counter-drug operations.

Cadet programs
The Civil Air Patrol offers a cadet program for youth aged 12 to 21, which covers topics such as aerospace education, leadership training, physical fitness and moral leadership.

Aerospace education
The Civil Air Patrol offers aerospace education for Civil Air Patrol members and the public, including providing training to the members of Civil Air Patrol, primarily through the cadet program, and through offering workshops for youth at schools and public aviation events.

Organization

See also
Awards and decorations of the Civil Air Patrol
South Carolina Air National Guard
South Carolina State Guard

References

External links
South Carolina Wing Civil Air Patrol official website

Wings of the Civil Air Patrol
Education in South Carolina
Military in South Carolina
Articles containing video clips